The 1928 Carnegie Tech Tartans football team represented the Carnegie Institute of Technology (now known as Carnegie Mellon University) as an independent during the 1928 college football season. Led by 14th-year head coach Walter Steffen, the Tartans compiled a record of 7–1. No November 17, Carnegie Tech beat Notre Dame at Cartier Field, the first time the Fighting Irish had been defeated at home in 23 years. Carnegie Tech played home games at Forbes Field in Pittsburgh. The team was ranked No. 6 in the nation in the Dickinson System ratings released in December 1928.

Schedule

References

Carnegie Tech
Carnegie Mellon Tartans football seasons
Carnegie Tech Tartans football